The soleal line, also known as the popliteal line (in older texts), is a prominent ridge on the posterior surface of the tibia. It is the site of many muscle origins and insertions, such as those of popliteus muscle, soleus muscle, flexor digitorum longus muscle, and tibialis posterior muscle.

Structure 
The soleal line is a prominent ridge on the posterior surface of the tibia. It extends obliquely downward from the back part of the articular facet for the fibula to the medial border, at the junction of its upper and middle thirds.

Development 
The soleal line becomes more prominent between childhood and adulthood. It is rarely seen in children between the ages of 6 and 8.

Function 
The soleal line marks the lower limit of the insertion of the popliteus muscle. It is the attachment of the fascia covering this muscle. It is the origin of part of soleus muscle (along with a triangular area above it), flexor digitorum longus muscle, and tibialis posterior muscle.

References

External links 
 Description at uams.edu
 

Bones of the lower limb
Tibia